Michael Jackson: The Last Photo Shoot is a documentary film directed by Craig J. Williams. This historical documentary is about Michael Jackson's last magazine cover-shoots in 2007. The film is a unique story told through the eyes of Michael's closest friends, photographers, and stylists that had helped Jackson prepare for his 2007 United States comeback after several years of living in seclusion overseas. In September of that year, photographer Bruce Weber and Vogue fashion editor as well as Jackson's personal stylist Rushka Bergman captured the magic of the King of Pop for the 25th anniversary reissue of his hit album Thriller, entitled Thriller 25. Later that month, Jackson did another shoot and an interview for Ebony magazine's December 2007 issue. This would mark Jackson's first United States interview and magazine story in over a decade.

Cast
 Michael Jackson (archive footage)
 Bruce Weber
 Rushka Bergman
 Phillip Bloch
 Matthew Rolston
 Thomas Mesereau
 Michael Amir
 Bryan Monroe
 Harriette Cole
 Prince Michael Jackson II
 Paris Jackson
 Janet Jackson
 Debbie Rowe
 Michael Joseph Jackson Jr

References

External links

Documentary films about Michael Jackson
American documentary films
Unreleased American films